Hopedale is a village in Harrison County, Ohio, United States. The population was 950 at the 2010 census.

History
Hopedale was platted in 1849. A post office has been in operation at Hopedale since 1850.

Geography

Demographics

2010 census
As of the census of 2010, there were 950 people, 369 households, and 249 families living in the village. The racial makeup of the village was 97.1% White, 0.8% African American, 0.3% Native American, 0.3% Asian, and 1.5% from two or more races. Hispanic or Latino of any race were 0.5% of the population.

There were 369 households, of which 29.0% had children under the age of 18 living with them, 53.1% were married couples living together, 8.4% had a female householder with no husband present, 6.0% had a male householder with no wife present, and 32.5% were non-families. 29.5% of all households were made up of individuals, and 16% had someone living alone who was 65 years of age or older. The average household size was 2.35 and the average family size was 2.88.

The median age in the village was 48 years. 21.6% of residents were under the age of 18; 4.8% were between the ages of 18 and 24; 20.1% were from 25 to 44; 28.3% were from 45 to 64; and 25.3% were 65 years of age or older. The gender makeup of the village was 48.9% male and 51.1% female.

2000 census
As of the census of 2000, there were 984 people, 383 households, and 278 families living in the village. The population density was 1,374.8 people per square mile (527.7/km2). There were 400 housing units at an average density of 558.8 per square mile (214.5/km2). The racial makeup of the village was 98.98% White, 0.61% African American, 0.10% Native American, and 0.30% from two or more races. Hispanic or Latino of any race were 0.51% of the population.

There were 383 households, out of which 28.2% had children under the age of 18 living with them, 62.1% were married couples living together, 8.6% had a female householder with no husband present, and 27.4% were non-families. 23.2% of all households were made up of individuals, and 14.6% had someone living alone who was 65 years of age or older. The average household size was 2.42 and the average family size was 2.83.

In the village, the population was spread out, with 21.3% under the age of 18, 4.7% from 18 to 24, 27.3% from 25 to 44, 22.4% from 45 to 64, and 24.3% who were 65 years of age or older. The median age was 43 years. For every 100 females there were 94.5 males. For every 100 females age 18 and over, there were 84.3 males.

The median income for a household in the village was $34,135, and the median income for a family was $38,558. Males had a median income of $35,263 versus $21,964 for females. The per capita income for the village was $16,536. About 9.8% of families and 11.8% of the population were below the poverty line, including 14.7% of those under age 18 and 8.5% of those age 65 or over.

References

External links
 

Villages in Harrison County, Ohio
Villages in Ohio